This list of botanical gardens and arboretums in Pennsylvania is intended to include all significant botanical gardens and arboretums in the U.S. state of Pennsylvania.

See also
List of botanical gardens and arboretums in the United States

References 

 
 
Tourist attractions in Pennsylvania
botanical gardens and arboretums in Pennsylvania